Alalia mostly refers to speech delay. It can also refer to

 Alalia syllabaris, stuttering
 Latin name of port city and former bishopric Aléria, on Corsica
 Battle of Alalia (530-535 BC)
 Al-Alia, Morocco

See also
 Echolalia